Abosede George is an associate professor of history and Africana studies at Barnard College. Her academic focus are in the areas of African history, childhood and youth studies, social reform in Africa, urban history, girl studies, women's studies, and migration studies. She is the incumbent President of the Nigerian Studies Association, an affiliate organization of the African Studies Association.

Background 

Abosede George obtained her B.A. in history from Rutgers University in 1999. She proceeded to Stanford University where she earned her M.A. and Ph.D. degrees in history in 2002 and 2006 respectively.

Career 
George began her teaching career in 2003 at Stanford University as a Teaching Fellow. In 2006, she moved to Trinity College as an assistant professor of history and international studies. George joined the faculty of Barnard College and Columbia University in 2007. Her research and teaching interests are in the areas of African urban history, history of childhood and youth in Africa, and women, gender, and sexuality in African History. From January to May 2011, she was a visiting assistant professor at her alma mater, Rutgers College – Rutgers University.

George has published widely on subjects such as girlhood in African/colonial cities, urbanism and social reform in colonial Africa, among others. Her articles have appeared in several first-tier, peer-reviewed academic journals, including the Journal of Social History, Women’s Studies Quarterly, and the Scholar and Feminist Online. George was one of the seven historians engaged in the AHR Conversation themed “Each Generation Writes Its Own History of Generations”. Her book, Making Modern Girls: A History of Girlhood, Labor, and Social Development, which was published in 2014, won her the 2015 Aidoo-Snyder Book Prize as the best scholarly book. Lately, she won the 2019 Paula J. Giddings Best Article Award for her article “Saving Nigerian Girls: A Critical Reflection on Girl-Saving Campaigns in the Colonial and Neoliberal Eras”.

George maintains faculty affiliations with the Africana Studies Program at Barnard, the Institute for African Studies at Columbia (IAS), the Barnard Center for Research on Women (BCRW), and the Center for the Critical Analysis of Social Difference (CCASD). She is a member of the following professional organizations: African Studies Association, Society for the History of Childhood and Youth, and Nigerian Studies Association where she is the current President. She is equally a member of the Board of Directors of the Lagos Studies Association, of which, together with Saheed Aderinto and Ademide Adelusi-Adeluyi, she is a foundation member.

Beyond academia, Abosede George has undertaken a number of creative, historical projects. For instance, the 2018 Lagos Photo Festival featured George's audio piece project which reworks the archives of a court case from the late 1800s in Lagos, Nigeria. An audio booth was provided in which visitors would sit in and listen to the trial and testimonies from the court case Ayebomi vs. Regina. The work received coverage by Vogue Italia.

Selected publications 
Abosede George, “Taling Walls: The Work of Brazilian Architecture and Identity in Nineteenth and Twentieth Century Lagos,” Journal of West African History 6, no. 2 (2020, forthcoming)
Abosede George, “Introduction: The Imaginative Capital of Lagos,” Comparative Studies in South Asia, Africa, and Middle East 38, no. 3 (2019): 439–442.
Abosede George, et al., “AHR Conversation: Each Generation Writes Its Own History of Generations,” The American Historical Review 123, no. 5 (2018): 1505–1546.
Abosede George, “Saving Nigerian Girls: A Critical Reflection on Girl-Saving Campaigns in the Colonial and Neoliberal Eras,” Meridians 17, no. 2 (2018): 309–324. Winner of the 2019 Paula J. Giddings Best Article Award.
Abosede George, Afterword to Trifonia Melibea Obono, La Bastarda, translated by Lawrence Schimel (New York: The Feminist Press, 2018)
Abosede George, “A Philosopher with a Plan: Reflections on Ifi Amadiume, Female Husband, Male Daughters: Gender and Sex in an African Society,” Journal of West African History 3, no. 2 (2017): 124–130.
Abosede George, Corinne T. Field, et al., “Roundtable: The History of Black Girlhood: Recent Innovations and Future Directions” Journal of the History of Childhood and Youth 9, no. 3 (2016): 383–401.
Abosede George, Making Modern Girls: A History of Girlhood, Labor, and Social Development in 20th Century Colonial Lagos (Athens, OH: Ohio University Press, New African Histories series, 2014). Winner of the 2015 Aidoo-Snyder Book Prize of the African Studies Association Women's Caucus.
Abosede George, “Getting the Hang of It,” Scholar and Feminist Online: Gender, Justice, and Neoliberal Transformations, 11, nos. 1&2 (2013).
Abosede George, “Within Salvation: Girl Hawkers and the Colonial State in Development Era Lagos,” Journal of Social History, 44, no. 3 (Spring 2011): 837–859.
Abosede George, “Feminist Activism and Class Politics: The Example of the Lagos Girl Hawker Project,” Women's Studies Quarterly 35, nos. 3&4 (2007): 128–143.

References

Living people
Nigerian academics
21st-century Nigerian historians
Barnard College faculty
Columbia University faculty
Stanford University alumni
Rutgers University alumni
Year of birth missing (living people)